The Hernando County Courthouse, built in 1913, is an historic courthouse building located in Brooksville, Florida, It was designed  by Atlanta-based architect William Augustus Edwards who designed one other courthouse in Florida, two in Georgia and nine in South Carolina as well as academic buildings at 12 institutions in Florida, Georgia and South Carolina. He designed most of the original buildings on the campus of the University of Florida in Gainesville. 

The courthouse been called the Brooksville crown. In 1989, The Hernando County Courthouse was listed in A Guide to Florida's Historic Architecture, published by the University of Florida Press.

References

External links 

 University of Florida biography of William Augustus Edwards
 
 Florida's Historic Courthouses
 St Petersburg Times: Brooksville 150 years

Buildings and structures in Hernando County, Florida
County courthouses in Florida
William Augustus Edwards buildings
Brooksville, Florida
Government buildings completed in 1913
1913 establishments in Florida